Mahdi is the prophesied redeemer of Islam. Mehdi is a variant alternative transliteration.

Mahdi may also refer to:

Islam 
 Al-Mahdi (744–785), third Abbasid Caliph, who ruled 775–785
 Muhammad al-Mahdi (869–?), twelfth and final Imam of Twelver Shi`a Islam
 Muhammad II al-Mahdi (976–1010), fourth Caliph of Córdoba in Al-Andalus (11th-century Moorish Iberia)
 Abdallah al-Mahdi Billah (873–934), Isma'ili imam and founder of the Fatimid dynasty, who ruled 909–934
 Mohammed Ahmed Mahdi or Muhammad Ahmad bin Abd Allah (1844–1885), Nubian religious leader of the Samaniyya order in Sudan
 Al-Mahdi al-Husayn (987–1013), imam of the Zaidi state in Yemen who ruled in the years 1003–1013

ibn al Mahdi
 Ubaydallah ibn al-Mahdi (771–810/11), Abbasid prince
 Ibrahim ibn al-Mahdi (779–839), Abbasid prince, singer, composer and poet
 Lubana bint Ali ibn al-Mahdi (c. 787/789 – after 820), Arab princess and poet

bint al Mahdi
 Abbasa bint al-Mahdi ibn al-Mansur ibn Muhammad (c. 765 – after 803), Abbasid princess
 Ulayya bint al-Mahdi (777–825), Abbasid princess

People with the given name

Arts and entertainment
 Mahdi Falahati (born 1958), Iranian writer, political expert, television presenter and poet
 Mahdi Fleifel (born 1979), Danish-Palestinian film director
 Mahdi Pakdel (born 1980), Iranian actor

Politics
 Abu Mahdi al-Muhandis (1954–2020), Iraqi leader, and commander of the Popular Mobilisation Committee
 Mahdi al-Arabi, Libyan brigadier-general who served in the Libyan Armed Forces
 Mahdi Amel, pen name and pseudonym of Hassan Abdullah Hamdan (1936–1987), Lebanese Marxist intellectual and militant
 Mehdi Bazargan (1907–1995), Iranian scholar, academic, activist and head of Iran's interim government
 Mahdi Dakhlallah (born 1947), Syrian politician and diplomat
 Mahdi Eraqi, or Mehdi Araghi (1930–1979), a founder of Fadayan-e Islam
 Mahdi Al-Gharrawi, Iraqi police officer, the former Commander of the Iraqi Federal Police in Nineveh Province, and Lieutenant General
 Mahdi Mohammed Gulaid, Somali politician, Vice President and then Acting Prime Minister of the Federal Republic of Somalia
 Mahdi Aliyu Gusau (born 1981), Nigerian politician, deputy governor of Zamfara State
 Mahdi al-Hafez (born 1943), Minister of Planning in the Interim Iraq Governing Council cabinet
 Mahdi al-Harati (born c. 1973), Irish-Libyan politician and former co-commander of the Tripoli Brigade during the Libyan Civil War
 Mahdi Quli Khan Hidayat (1863–1955), Iranian politician, Prime Minister of Iran
 Abdul Mahdi al-Karbalai (born 1955), Iraqi Shia Muslim scholar
 Mahdi al-Mashat (born 1986), Yemeni political figure from the Houthi movement
 Mahdi Al Tajir (born 1931), Ambassador of the United Arab Emirates to the United Kingdom
 Mahdi Tajik (born 1981), Iranian student activist, journalist and political prisoner

Religion

 Al-Mahdi Ahmad (1633–1681), Imam of Yemen who ruled 1676–1681
 Al-Mahdi Muhammad bin Ahmed (1637–1718), also known as Ṣāḥib al-Mawāhib, Imam of Yemen who ruled 1689–1718
 Al-Mahdi Abbas (1719–1775), Imam of Yemen who ruled 1748–1775
 Mahdi Puya or Ayatullah Agha Hajji Mirza Mahdi Puya Yazdi (1899–1973), Twelver Shi`a Muslim and Islamic scholar
 Mahdi al-Modarresi (born 1977), Muslim scholar and lecturer

Sports
 Al-Mahdi Ali Mukhtar (born 1992), Qatari footballer
 Mahdi Abdul-Sahib (born 1956), Iraqi footballer
 Mahdi Abduljabbar (born 1991), Bahraini footballer 
 Mahdi Abu-Omar (born 1970), Palestinian American chemist
 Mahdi Afri (born 1996), Moroccan visually impaired Paralympic athlete 
 Mahdi Fahri Albaar (born 1995), Indonesian footballer 
 Mahdi Ali or Mahdi Ali Hassan Redha (born 1965), Emirati footballer and sports manager
 Mahdi Camara (born 1998), French footballer 
 Mahdi Ben Cheikh (born 1979), Tunisian volleyball player
 Mahdi Fahes (born 1994), Lebanese footballer
 Mahdi Houryar (born 1945), Iranian wrestler
 Mahdi Jassim (born 1956), Iraqi footballer
 Mahdi Javid (born 1987), Iranian futsal player
 Mahdi Kadhim (born 1967), Iraqi footballer 
 Mahdi Kamil Shiltagh (born 1995), Iraqi footballer 
 Mahdi Karim Ajeel (born 1983), Iraqi footballer
 Mahdi El Khammasi (born 1987), Tunisian born-Qatari footballer
 Mahdi Houssein Mahabeh (born 1995), Djibouti footballer
 Mahdi Marandi (born 1986), Iranian volleyball player
 Mahdi Ouatine (born 1987), Moroccan amateur boxer
 Mahdi Salman, Iraqi basketball player

Others
 Mahdi Abbaszadeh, Iranian philosopher and associate professor of epistemology 
 Mahdi Abdul Hadi (born 1944), a political scientist, historian, columnist, author, founder and member of various Palestinian, Arab and international institutions
 Mahdi Agnelli born Edoardo Agnelli (1954–2000), eldest child and only son of Gianni Agnelli, the industrialist patriarch of Fiat
 Mahdi Ahouie (born 1977), Iranian political scientist
 Mahdi Bray, born Wright Bray (born 1950), Muslim American civil and human rights activist
 Mahdi Elmandjra (1933–2014), Moroccan futurist, economist and sociologist
 Mahdi Ghalibafian (1935-2007), Iranian civil engineer and university professor
 Mahdi Gilbert (born 1989), Canadian professional sleight of hand card magician
 Mahdi S. Hantush (1921–1984), American hydrologist
 Mahdi Moudini (born Mahdi Moammer; 1979), Iranian illusionist
 Mahdi Khajeh Piri (born 1955), founder of Noor International Microfilm Center

People with the middle name

Arts and entertainment
 Amir Mahdi Jule (born 1980), Iranian screenwriter and actor

Politics
 Ali Mahdi Muhammad (born 1939), politician and entrepreneur, president of Somalia in 1991
 Ali Yahya Mahdi Al Raimi, Yemeni who was captured and transferred to the United States Guantanamo Bay Naval Base
 Muhammad Mahdi Kubba (1900–1984), Iraqi politician
 Muhammad al-Mahdi as-Senussi (1844–1902), the supreme leader of the Sufi Senussi Order 
 Salih Mahdi Ammash (1924–1985), Iraqi historian, writer, author, poet, politician and Iraqi army officer
 Sayyid Hasan ar-Rida al-Mahdi as-Sanussi (1928–1992), King of Libya
 Sayyid Muhammad bin Sayyid Hasan ar-Rida al-Mahdi as-Sanussi (born 1962), Crown Prince of Libya

Religion
 Mohammed Mahdi Akef (1928–2017), head of the Muslim Brotherhood
 Mirza Mahdi Elahi Qomshehei (1901–1973), Iranian mystic, poet, translator of the Quran, and one of the grand Masters of the philosophical school of Tehran
 Mirza Mahdi al-Shirazi (1887–1961), also known as Grand Ayatollah Mirza Mahdi al-Husayni al-Shirazi, Iraqi-Iranian Shia marja
 Mulla Muhammad Mahdi Naraqi (1715–1795), Shia philosopher and theologian

Sports
 Mohammad Mahdi Jafari (born 1964), Iranian karateka
 Mohannad Mahdi Al-Nadawi (born 1975), Iraqi footballer

Others
 Amèle El Mahdi (born 1956), Algerian professor of mathematics and writer
 Huda Salih Mahdi Ammash (1953–2016), American-educated Iraqi scientist
 Mirza Mahdi Ashtiani (1888–1952), Iranian philosopher
 Mohammad Mahdi Nayebi (born 1967), Iranian electrical engineer
 Syed Mahdi Hasnain, Indian commanding officer

People with the surname

Arts and entertainment
 Alexander Siddig or Siddig El Tahir El Fadil El Siddig Abderahman Mohammed Ahmed Abdel Karim El Mahdi (born 1965), a Sudanese-born British actor

Politics
 Abbas Mahdi (born 1898), Iraqi politician and public servant 
 Abd al-Rahman al-Mahdi (1885–1959), religious and political figures in Anglo-Egyptian Sudan
 Abdirahman Mahdi, founder of the Ogaden National Liberation Front
 Abubakar Mahdi, Nigerian politician and Senator for the Borno South constituency of Borno State, Nigeria
 Adil Abdul-Mahdi (born 1942), Prime Minister of Iraq
 Ahmad al-Faqi al-Mahdi (born 1975), also known as Abu Tourab, member of Ansar Dine, a Tuareg Islamist militia in North Africa
 Ahmad Hamza Al-Mahdi, Libyan politician
 Fawaz Naman Hamoud Abdallah Mahdi, extrajudicial prisoner of the United States
 Imam al-Hadi al-Mahdi or Sayyid Hadi Abdulrahman al-Mahdi (1918–1971), Sudanese political and religious figure and leader of the Sudanese Ansar religious order
 Khaled A. Mahdi (born 1970), Kuwaiti government official
 Mariam al-Mahdi (born 1965), Sudanese politician
 Mubarak al Fadil al Mahdi (born 1950), Sudanese economist and politician
 Muhammad Mahdi Salih Al-Rawi (born 1947 or 1949), Iraqi politician and government minister
 Sadiq al-Mahdi (born 1935), Sudanese political and religious figure
 Siddick Sayed el-Mahdi (1911–1961), Sudanese religious and political leader
 Sammy Mahdi (born 1988), Belgian politician

Religion
 Abdul Razzaq al-Mahdi (born 1961), Syrian Islamist cleric

Sports
 Ala Addin Mahdi (born 1996), Yemeni footballer 
 Dhurgham Mahdi (born 1951), Iraqi footballer
 Hussain Mahdi (born 2000), Emirati footballer 
 Khaled Mahdi (footballer) (born 1987), Palestinian footballer
 Saleh Mehdi (born 1981), Kuwaiti footballer

Others
 As Sayyid Al Imaam Issa Al Haadi Al Mahdi also known as Malachi Z. York, Issa Al Haadi Al Mahdi, better known as Dwight York, American musician and writer
 Muhsin Mahdi (1926–2007), Iraqi-American Islamologist and Arabist
 Saudatu Mahdi (born 1957), Nigerian women's rights advocate

Places
Mosques
 Al-Mahdi Mosque, the Mosque of the Dome of the Mahdi or Al-Mahdi Mosque, one of the historical mosques in the historic old city of Sana'a, Yemen
 Al Mahdi Mosque, Bradford in Bradford, United Kingdom
Imam Mahdi Mosque, a mosque located in Kuwait City

Others
 Aba Saleh al-Mahdi tunnel, a highway tunnel in Asia running under the Zagros Mountains in the Eqlid, Fars Province of Iran
 El Imam El Mahdi University, Sudanese university
 Sidi Mahdi Airport, Algeria
 Tizi Mahdi, town and commune in Médéa Province, Algeria

Others
 33rd Al-Mahdi Division, brigade of the Islamic Revolutionary Guard Corps named after the twelfth Shia Imam, Al-Mahdi
 Abu Mahdi (missile), an Iranian naval cruise missile
 The Mahdi, a 1981 political fiction novel
 Mahdi Army, now known as the Peace Companies, militia controlled by Muqtada al-Sadr in Iraq
 Mahdi (Dune), a fictional prophet in Frank Herbert's Dune universe
 Mahdi (malware), malware discovered in February 2012

See also
 List of Mahdi claimants, religious leaders claiming the position
 Mahdist (disambiguation)
 Mahdist War, a colonial war of the late 19th century
 Mardi (disambiguation)
 Muhammad Ahmad (1844–1885), leader of Sudan's mahdiyya regime in the 19th century